Erato Records is a record label founded in 1953 as Disques Erato by Philippe Loury to promote French classical music. Loury was head of éditions musicales Costallat. His first releases in France were licensed from the Haydn Society of Boston, and he made Erato's first recording in January 1953: Marc-Antoine Charpentier's Te Deum with Les Jeunesses Muslcales.

Michel Garcin became the label's artistic director and producer and built up the catalogue with contemporary French composers such as Henri Dutilleux and French artists: Jean-François Paillard (234 records), Marie-Claire Alain (234 records), Maurice André (198 records), Jean-Pierre Rampal (127 records), and Lily Laskine.

Notable recordings
Erato released first recordings of

J S Bach's complete organ works, played by Marie-Claire Alain, in 1968
J M Leclair's works, played by Jean-François Paillard, in 1978
D Scarlatti's complete keyboard sonatas, played by Scott Ross, in 1988.
The world premiere of John Corigliano's Symphony No. 1, performed by the Chicago Symphony Orchestra under Daniel Barenboim, in 1990

Warner acquisition
Erato was distributed in the US on the RCA Red Seal label for many years. In 1992, Erato was acquired by Warner Music. In 1999, Erato launched a subsidiary named Detour Records. A large prestige project, the Koopman Bach cantatas project, was canceled mid-way after Warner also acquired Teldec in 1998, although the Dutch conductor was able to buy back his recordings and finish the project on his own label. In 2001, Warner closed Erato.

Revival with Virgin Classics catalogue
In 2013, the label was revived with WEA’s acquisition of EMI Classics and Virgin Classics, which became part of Warner Classics. Erato absorbed the Virgin Classics artists roster and catalogue (the EMI Classics label's artists roster and catalogue was absorbed into the Warner Classics label) but not the rights to the EMI or Virgin names. In October 2013 several of Virgin Classics key artists—Alexandre Tharaud, Natalie Dessay, Diana Damrau, Renaud Capuçon, and Philippe Jaroussky—appeared on new Erato titles that had already been in production by Virgin Classics/EMI.

See also
 List of record labels

References

French record labels
Classical music record labels
Early music record labels
Record labels established in 1953
Warner Music labels